The Musician Killer is a 1976 French drama film directed by Benoît Jacquot and starring Anna Karina.

Cast
 Anna Karina - Louise
 Joël Bion - Gilles
 Hélène Coulomb - Anne
 Gunars Larsens - Storm
 Philippe March - Le directeur
 Howard Vernon - Anton Varga
 Daniel Isoppo - Le chômeur
 Boris De Vinogradov - Le chef d'orchestre
 Elise Ross - La cantatrice
 Elisabeth Strauss - L'hôtesse
 Antoine Leroy - Le jeune élève

References

External links

1976 films
1970s French-language films
1976 drama films
Films directed by Benoît Jacquot
French drama films
1970s French films